Olupaka Combined School is a school in Eyanda village in Outapi Constituency in northern Namibia. The school was founded in 1951 by the Roman Catholic Mission and became a state school in 1972. The school patron is Chief Justice Peter Shivute; former Namibian president Sam Nujoma is its goodwill ambassador.

See also
 List of schools in Namibia
 Education in Namibia

References

Schools in Omusati Region
1951 establishments in South West Africa